Matsuhashi (written: 松橋) is a Japanese surname. Notable people with the surname include:

, Japanese footballer
, Japanese singer
, Japanese footballer
, Japanese ski jumper
, Japanese footballer
, Japanese rugby union player
, Japanese cross-country skier

Japanese-language surnames